The Birch Lakes State Forest is a state forest located in Stearns County, Minnesota. One of the smallest Minnesota state forests, it is managed primarily for recreation by the Minnesota Department of Natural Resources. Big Birch Lake, a  sand- and marl-bottomed lake, is accessible from the northeast corner of the forest. The forest is located in a transitory ecotone between the temperate deciduous forest to the northeast and the tallgrass prairie to the southwest, with the rolling terrain characteristic of the glacial activity in the area.

Outdoor recreation activities include boating, fishing, swimming in Big Birch Lake, as well as hunting, picnicking, and backcountry camping in the forest.

Campground
The Birch lakes State Forest Campground is considered a primitive campground. An individual site is $14, which consists of a cleared area, fire ring, and tables. In addition, a vault toilet, garbage cans, and drinking water is available. 
The campground features 29 shaded campsites located near the Big Birch Lake.

See also
List of Minnesota state forests

References

External links
Birch Lakes State Forest - Minnesota Department of Natural Resources (DNR)

Minnesota state forests
Protected areas of Stearns County, Minnesota
Protected areas established in 1959